José Higinio Gómez González (3 April 1932 − 8 January 2008) was a Spanish Roman Catholic bishop.

Ordained to the priesthood in 1956, Gómez González was named bishop of Roman Catholic Diocese of Lugo, Spain in 1980 and retired in 2007.

References

1932 births
2008 deaths
People from Lalín
20th-century Roman Catholic bishops in Spain